The White Rose (die Weiße Rose in German) was a non-violent resistance movement in Nazi Germany, 1942-1943.

White Rose may also refer to:

History
 White Rose of York, the symbol of Yorkshire & the House of York
 Order of the White Rose of Finland, an award in Finland
 Order of the White Rose (1886–1915), Late Victorian Neo-Jacobite society

 White Rose, an historical community that is now part of Newmarket, Ontario

Film
 The White Rose (1914 film), an American film
 White Rose (film), a 1919 Hungarian film directed by Alexander Korda
 The White Rose (1923 film), directed by D. W. Griffith
 The White Rose (1933 film), an Egyptian film
 The White Rose (1954 film), a Cuban-Mexican drama film
 Die Weiße Rose (film), a 1982 German language film based on the White Rose anti-Nazi movement

Literature
 The White Rose (Cook novel), a fantasy novel by Glen Cook
 The White Rose (Traven novel), by B. Traven
 Tokeah, or the White Rose, by Charles Sealsfield
 The White Rose (play), a 1991 play by playwright Lillian Garrett-Groag
 White Rose, part of a trilogy by R. Garcia y Robertson

Music
White Rose (band), an Indonesian pop punk band
"The White Rose" (song), a traditional Cornish folk song
 "White Rose", a song by Canadian folk/country artist Fred Eaglesmith
 Weiße Rose (opera) (1976, 1986), an opera by Udo Zimmermann
White Rose Movement, a British post-punk band

Business
 White Rose oil field, an oil field off the coast of Newfoundland
 White Rose (food product), a low-cost food brand in New York City
 The White Rose Centre, a shopping centre in Morley, West Yorkshire
 White Rose Hamburgers, a hamburger restaurant with locations in New Jersey

Other
 White Rose (Italy), an Italian political party
 White Rose, Indiana, a community in the United States
 White Rose Project, a proposed power plant in the UK
 White Rose University Consortium, a partnership between the University of Leeds, University of Sheffield and University of York
 White Rose Varsity Tournament, a sports competition between the University of York and York St John College
 White Rose railway station, a proposed railway station in West Yorkshire, England
 White Rose (disinformation group), a group dedicated to spreading disinformation about COVID-19
 Bánh bao bánh vạc, a Vietnamese dumpling, often called "White Rose" by westerners
 White Rose, emblem of Yorkshire County Cricket Club